Puerto Rico Highway 34 (PR-34) is an urban road located in Caguas, Puerto Rico. This road extends from Avenida José Garrido (PR-196) in Cañabón barrio to PR-183 in Tomás de Castro barrio, and is part of Turabo and Degetau avenues.

Route description
This road intersects with PR-156 and PR-784 as Avenida Turabo in the west side of the city. Then it intersects with Autopista Luis A. Ferré (PR-52), Avenida José Gautier Benítez (PR-1) and Avenida Luis Muñoz Marín (PR-32) as Avenida Degetau. On September 9, 2021, an extension to the east side of the city was opened as Avenida Extensión Degetau. This avenue is located between PR-32 and PR-183 in Tomás de Castro barrio.

Major intersections

See also

 List of highways numbered 34

References

External links

 Extension Degetau Avenue PR-34, Caguas

034
Caguas, Puerto Rico